Susceptibility may refer to:

Physics and engineering
In physics the susceptibility is a quantification for the change of an extensive property under variation of an intensive property. The word may refer to:

 In physics, the susceptibility of a material or substance describes its response to an applied field. For example:
 Magnetic susceptibility
 Electric susceptibility
 The two types of susceptibility above are examples of a linear response function; sometimes the terms susceptibility and linear response function are used interchangeably.
In electromagnetic compatibility (EMC), susceptibility is the sensitivity of a device's function to incoming electromagnetic interference

Health and medicine
 In epidemiology, a susceptible individual is a member of a population who is at risk of becoming infected by a disease
 In microbiology, pharmacology, and medicine drug susceptibility is the ability of a microorganism to be inhibited or killed by the drug, as in antibiotic susceptibility, the susceptibility of microorganisms to antibiotics (often used synonymously with the lay term sensitivity)

Botany and environmental science
 Susceptibility to pathogens is the extent to which a plant, vegetation complex, or ecological community would suffer from a pathogen if exposed, without regard to the likelihood of exposure  the opposite of Plant disease resistance
 It should not be confused with vulnerability, which by convention in this field takes into account both the effect of exposure and the likelihood of exposure

Military science
 The vulnerability of a target audience to particular forms of psychological warfare

See also
 Vulnerability